Muráň (earlier Podmuráň) is a village and municipality in Revúca District in the Banská Bystrica Region of Slovakia.

Geography
The village is located around 9 km north of Revúca, in the Muráň river valley. The Muráň Plateau is located north and west of the village, with the governing body of the Muránska planina National Park seated in the village. There is a local railway track from Plešivec (Rožňava District) ending in Muráň.

History
The village was first mentioned in 1321 as a settlement under the Muráň Castle.

King Ferdinand I of Bulgaria had a manor house in the village, Predná Hora mansion, which is now a specialized hospital.

References

External links
 
 

Villages and municipalities in Revúca District